The Three Ages of Buddhism, also known as the Three Ages of the Dharma, are three divisions of time following Shakyamuni Buddha's death and passing into Nirvana in East Asian Buddhism.

Three Ages

The Three Ages of Buddhism are three divisions of time following Buddha's passing:

 Former Day of the Dharma — also known as the “Age of the Right Dharma”, the first thousand years (or 500 years) during which the Buddha's disciples are able to uphold the Buddha's teachings; 
 Middle Day of the Dharma — also known as the “Age of Semblance Dharma”, the second thousand years (or 500 years), which only resembles the right Dharma;
 Latter Day of the Dharma — also known as “the Degenerate Age of Dharma”, which is to last for 10,000 years during which the Dharma declines.

In the Sutra of the Great Assembly, the three periods are further divided into five five-hundred year periods, the fifth and last of which was prophesied to be when the Buddhism of Shakyamuni Buddha would lose all power of salvation and a new Buddha would appear to save the people. This time period would be characterized by unrest, strife, famine, and natural disasters.

The three periods are significant to Mahayana adherents, particularly those who hold the Lotus Sutra in high regard, namely the Tiantai and Tendai and Nichiren Buddhism, who believe that different Buddhist teachings are valid (i.e., able to lead practitioners to enlightenment) in each period due to the different capacity to accept a teaching of the people born in each respective period.

Latter Day of the Dharma
Traditionally, this age is supposed to begin 2000 years after Shakyamuni Buddha's passing and last for 10,000 years or more. Shakyamuni, in the Sutra of the Great Assembly (Jpn. Daijuku-kyō), describes the Latter Day of the Dharma (Jpn. Mappo) as "the age of conflict", when “Quarrels and disputes will arise among the adherents to my teachings, and the Pure Dharma will become obscured and lost.” In this evil latter age, when society is disordered, Shakyamuni's Buddhism will lose its power to benefit the people, as people born into the Latter Day of the Dharma, do not have the seed of Buddhahood sown into them.

According to the interpretation of Nichiren Buddhism, in the Lotus Sutra (Jpn. Myōhō-Renge-Kyō) Shakyamuni Buddha entrusted the propagation of the Lotus Sutra in the Latter Day of the Dharma to the Bodhisattva named Superior Practices (Jpn. Jogyo Bosatsu), the leader of the Bodhisattvas of the Earth. Shakyamuni predicted in the 21st Chapter of the Lotus Sutra (jinriki), that Bodhisattva Jogyo, the ephemeral figure of the Original Buddha, would appear in the Latter Day of the Dharma, dispel the fundamental darkness of all mankind, and lead the people to attain enlightenment.

The Nichiren Shoshu school of Buddhism, believes that Nichiren Daishonin is Votary of the Lotus Sutra in the Latter Day of the Dharma.  Shakyamuni declared that the Votary of the Lotus Sutra in the Latter Day of the Dharma would be "spoken ill of and cursed", "would be wounded by swords and staves and pelted with stones and tiles" and "again and again banished."  Nichiren Shoshu states that Nichiren Daishonin's actions matched the prediction that Shakyamuni Buddha taught.  They cite the Izu and Sado Exile ("again and again banished") and the Tatsunokuchi Persecution where the government attempted to execute the Daishonin ("wounded by swords and staves") for propagating Myōhō-Renge-Kyō throughout Japan.  Thus, the Shoshu states that Nichiren Daishonin proved he was the votary of the Lotus Sutra by "reading the Lotus Sutra with his very life."

Furthermore, when viewed from the standpoint of his ephemeral or transient (shaku) identity and his external function, Nichiren Daishonin is defined as the rebirth of Bodhisattva Superior Practices (Jogyo Bosatsu). However, when viewed from the standpoint of his true (hon) identity and his inner realization, Nichiren Daishonin is defined as the Buddha of Intrinsically Perfect Wisdom from the infinite past of kuon-ganjo (kuon-ganjo jijuyu hoshin nyorai).

Maitreya
Buddhist temporal cosmology assumes a cyclical pattern of ages, and even when the current Buddha's teachings fall into disregard, a new Buddha will at some point (usually considered to be millions of years in the future) be born to ensure the continuity of Buddhism. In the Lotus Sutra, Viśiṣṭacāritra is entrusted to spread Buddhist dharma in this age and save mankind and the earth. He and countless other bodhisattvas, specifically called Bodhisattvas of the Earth (of which he is the leader), vow to be reborn in a latter day to re-create Buddhist dharma, thus turning the degenerate age into a flourishing paradise. Gautama Buddha entrusts them instead of his more commonly known major disciples with this task since the Bodhisattvas of the Earth have had a karmic connection with Gautama Buddha since the beginning of time, meaning that they are aware of the Superior Practice which is the essence of Buddhism or the Dharma in its original, pure form. Kṣitigarbha is also known for his vow to take responsibility for the instruction of all beings in the six worlds, in the era between the death of Gautama and the rise of Maitreya. Teacher Shavaripa would also live in the world to teach someone.

Teachings of different groups
The teaching appeared early. References to the decline of the Dharma over time can be found in such Mahayana sutras as the Diamond Sutra and the Lotus Sutra, but also to a lesser degree in some texts in the Pāli Canon such as the Cullavagga of the Vinaya Pitaka. Nanyue Huisi was an early monk who taught about it; he is considered the third Patriarch of the Tiantai.

The Sanjiejiao was an early sect that taught about Mò Fǎ. It taught to respect every sutra and all sentient life.

Late Buddhism in Central Asia taught the building of auspicious signs or miraculous Buddhist images.

Pure Land Buddhism in China and Japan believe we are now in this latter age of "degenerate Dharma". Pure Land followers therefore attempt to attain rebirth into the pure land of Amitābha, where they can practice the Dharma more readily.

Nichiren Buddhism has taught that its teaching is the most suitable for the recent Mò Fǎ period.

Vajrayana Buddhism taught that its teaching would be popular when "iron birds are upon the sky" before its decline. The Kalacakra tantra contains a prophecy of a holy war in which a Buddhist king will win.

Theravada Buddhists taught that Buddhism would decline in five thousand years.

Some monks such as Dōgen and Xuyun had alternative views regarding dharma decline. Dōgen believed that there is no Mò Fǎ while Xuyun thought Mò Fǎ is not inevitable.

Some Chinese folk religions taught that the three ages were the teaching period of Dīpankara Buddha, Gautama Buddha, and the current era of Maitreya.

References

Bibliography
 Buswell, Robert E., ed. (2004). Encyclopedia of Buddhism ("Decline of the Dharma"). Macmillan Reference USA. . pp. 210-213
 Chappell, David Wellington (1980). Early Forebodings of the Death of Buddhism, Numen, 27 (1), 122-154 

 Lamotte, Etienne; Webb-Boin Sara, trans. (1988). History of Indian Buddhism: From the origins to the Śaka era.  Louvain Paris: Peters Press, pp. 191-202
 Marra, Michele (1988). "The development of mappō thought in Japan (I)", Japanese Journal of Religious Studies 15 (1), 25-54. PDF
 Marra, Michele (1988). "The development of mappō thought in Japan (II)", Japanese Journal of Religious Studies 15 (4), 287-305. PDF
 Nadeau, Randall L. (1987). "The 'Decline of the Dharma' in Early Chinese Buddhism", Asian Review volume 1 (transl. of the "Scripture Preached by the Buddha on the Total Extinction of the Dharma")
 Nattier, Jan  (1991). Once Upon a Future Time: Studies in a Buddhist Prophecy of Decline, Berkeley, Calif.: Asian Humanities Press
 Stone, Jackie (1985). Seeking Enlightenment in the Last Age: "Mappō" Thought in Kamakura Buddhism: PART I, The Eastern Buddhist New Series, 18, (1), 28-56 
 Stone, Jackie (1985). Seeking Enlightenment in the Last Age: "Mappō" Thought in Kamakura Buddhism: PART II, The Eastern Buddhist New Series, 18, (2), 35-64 
 Zürcher, Eric (1981). Eschatology and Messianism in Early Chinese Buddhism, Leiden: Leyden Studies in Sinology

External links
 The Buddha Speaks the Ultimate Extinction of the Dharma Sutra, The Buddhist Text Translation Society

Buddhist cosmology
Buddhist eschatology
Buddhist philosophical concepts
History of Buddhism
Nichiren Buddhism
Tiantai
Time in Buddhism